Vitex amaniensis is a species of plant in the family Lamiaceae. It is endemic to Tanzania.

References

Endemic flora of Tanzania
amaniensis
Vulnerable plants
Taxonomy articles created by Polbot